Union council, also known as union parishad, rural council, rural union and simply union, is the smallest rural administrative and local government unit in Bangladesh. Each union council is made up of nine wards. Usually one village is designated as a ward. There are 4,562 unions in Bangladesh.  A union council consists of a chairman and twelve members including three members exclusively reserved for women. Union councils are formed under the Local Government (Union Parishads) Act, 2009. The boundary of each union council is demarcated by the Deputy Commissioner of the District. A union council is the body primarily responsible for agricultural, industrial and community development within the local limits of the union.

History 
The term union dates back to the 1870 British legislation titled the Village Chowkidari Act which established union panchayats for collecting tax to maintain chowkidars (village police) in Bengal. Later the rural layer of the local government became known as union councils. After Independence in 1971, the name of the Union Council was changed to Union Panchayat and an administrator was appointed to manage the affairs of the panchayat. In 1973, union panchayat's name reverted to union parishad. A more significant change was brought about in 1976 through the Local Government Ordinance which provided for a Union Parishad composed of one elected chairman and nine elected members, two nominated women members and two peasant representative members. A major change was initiated through the introduction of the Local Government (Union Parishad) Ordinance in 1983. Under this ordinance, every Union council shall have one chairman, nine general members and three women members. The present law dealing with the Union Councils, i.e. Local Government (Union Parishads) Act, 2009, came into effect on 15 October 2009.

Election 
There are nine general members and three women members. The chairman and members are elected by direct election on the basis of adult franchise every five years. Three reserved women members, one for each three Wards, are also elected by direct election. The chairman and Member candidates must be Bangladeshi citizens having their names in the electoral roll of the respective Union or Ward. General elections of the Union Councils are conducted by the Bangladesh Election Commission. Majority Members of a Union Council may bring a motion of no confidence against a member or chairman to the Upazila Nirbahi Officer.

Powers and functions 
Every Union Parishad is a body corporate, having perpetual succession and a common seal, with power to acquire and hold property. The functions with which the Union Parishads are entrusted by law include the following:

 Maintenance of law and order and assistance to administration for this purpose. 
 Adoption and implementation of development schemes in the fields of local economy and society. 
 Performing administrative and establishment functions. 
 Providing public welfare services.

Ward meetings

Citizen charter 
Every Union Council is required to publish a citizen charter describing all the services it provides. The charter includes description, timing, pricing, procedures and the conditions for the services. The remedies for non-compliance with the charter by the council or any individual is also mentioned in the charter itself.

Trial of offenses 
The chairman has power to conduct trial and give punishment for certain petty crimes. These crimes include evasion of Union tax or fine, polluting environment, obstruction to public passage, failure to quarantine, prostitution business etc.

Funding 
Every Union Parishad has a fund known as the Union Fund consisting of:
 Taxes, rates, fees and other charges levied by the Union Parishad under The Local Government (Union Parishads) Act 2009;
 Rents and profits payable or accruing to the Union Parishad from its own property;
 Money received by the Union Parishad in the performance of its functions;
 Money contributed by individuals or institutions or by any local authority;
 Receipts accruing from the trusts placed under the management of the Union Parishad;
 Grants made by the Government and other authorities;
 Profits accruing from investments; and
 Proceeds from other sources directed by the Government.
The chairman and members work full-time and receive honorarium from the government.

References 

Local government in Bangladesh